William Cowan (October 25, 1825 – January 7, 1899) was a farmer and reeve of North Gower Township, Ontario.

He was born in County Leitrim, Ireland in 1825, the son of Patrick Cowan, and was educated there, earning a teaching certificate. He emigrated to North America and arrived in Bytown around 1845. He taught school in North Gower for five years. In 1850, he married Caroline McCrea; he also purchased a farm in the township around that time. Cowan was reeve for the township from 1865 to 1869. In 1866, he served as warden for Carleton County. Cowan also served as justice of the peace, was clerk in the division court for 21 years and became a captain in the local militia. In 1870, he was named secretary for the county and, in 1873, was named county treasurer. With these postings, Cowan sold his farm and moved to Ottawa, where he served on the board of Water Commissioners.

Obituary<ref>{{cite news |newspaper=Kemptville Weekly Advance |title=Cowan, Mr. William Killed Going to a Funeral|date=January 12, 1899}}</ref>'''

(condensed)
On Saturday morning, at 8:30, Co. Treasurer Wm. Cowan and Son, Holmes Cowan, 
proprietor of the Gilpin House, were being driven to Ottawa East to attend the 
funeral of the late Chas. O'Gara, when their spirited horses took fright and ran away.  
The Parry Sound train was just rounding the curve at the head of the deep cut, and into 
this the horses dashed, striking between the tender and the baggage car ............. 
Mr. Cowan and his son met death instantly. .............. Mr. Cowan made his last will on
Friday.  Owing to the approaching marriage of his daughter Miss Maggie Cowan, he found it
necessary to add a codicil .......... Wm. Cowan was born in the county Leitrim, Ireland,
December 17, 1825.  He came to Bytown in 1845.  He taught school for five years in North
Gower and then settled upon a farm which he had purchased.  He married in 1850, Caroline,
daughter of Capt. Thomas McCrea of Montague, a veteran of the war of 1812.  About the same time
he was appointed clerk of the Division Court, including North Gower and Marlboro.  He held
that position for 21 years.  He was township councillor for eight years and reeve for five 
years.  In 1870 he was appointed county clerk and in 1873 county treasurer, a position he
held till his death.

References 

1825 births
1899 deaths
Reeves of North Gower Township
Irish emigrants to pre-Confederation Ontario
Politicians from County Leitrim
People from County Leitrim
Railway accident deaths in Canada
Accidental deaths in Ontario
Immigrants to the Province of Canada
Canadian justices of the peace